General Bruce Keener Holloway (September 1, 1912 – September 30, 1999) was a United States Air Force general. A West Point graduate, he was a fighter ace with the United States Army Air Forces in World War II and later served as Vice Chief of Staff of the United States Air Force and commander-in-chief of the Strategic Air Command.

Early life and career

Holloway was one of two children born to Frank P. Holloway, a mill owner, and Elizabeth Keener, a homemaker. He graduated from Knoxville High School in 1929 and studied engineering for two years at the University of Tennessee before attending Marion Military Institute, preparing for appointment to the United States Military Academy, where he graduated in 1937. Assigned to the Army Air Corps, he received his pilot wings in 1938 at Kelly Field, San Antonio, Texas, then served two years with the Sixth Pursuit Squadron and 18th Pursuit Group in Hawaii before taking a postgraduate course in aeronautical engineering at the California Institute of Technology.

World War II
After The US entered World War II in December 1941, Holloway was sent to China to observe Chennault's American Volunteer Group (AVG), the Flying Tigers. He became the commander of the 23rd Fighter Group USAAF. During his China tour, Holloway earned status as a fighter ace, shooting down 13 Japanese planes. He returned to the US in 1944.

Post-war

As commander of the Army Air Forces' first jet-equipped fighter group in 1946, Holloway pioneered in this new field of tactical jet air operations.

After graduation from the National War College in 1951, he progressed through key staff assignments in both operations and development fields at Headquarters U.S. Air Force. Later, as director of operational requirements, he played a key role in preparing and evaluating proposals for many aircraft and missiles.

Holloway spent four years in Tactical Air Command (TAC) as deputy commander of both the 9th and 12th Air Forces, and in 1961 he was named deputy commander in chief of the U.S. Strike Command at MacDill Air Force Base, Florida. Later in that assignment, he also fulfilled additional responsibilities as deputy commander in chief of the Middle East/Southern Asia and Africa South of the Sahara Command.

Senior commands and retirement

General Holloway assumed command of the U.S. Air Forces in Europe in July 1965, serving in that capacity until his appointment as Vice Chief of Staff of the United States Air Force on August 1, 1966, at The Pentagon. He became commander-in-chief of the Strategic Air Command at Offutt Air Force Base, Nebraska, on August 1, 1968, and remained in that position until retiring from the Air Force on 30 April 1972.

Holloway died of heart failure at age 87 in Orlando, Florida on 30 September 1999. His remains were cremated and interred in his hometown of Knoxville, Tennessee.

Awards and decorations
Holloway's decorations include the Army Distinguished Service Medal, Air Force Distinguished Service Medal, Silver Star, Legion of Merit, Distinguished Flying Cross, Air Medal, and foreign decorations which include the Order of the Sacred Tripod (China), Order of the Cloud and Banner, Chinese Air Force Pilot Wings, The Grand Cross of the Order of Merit of the Federal Republic of Germany with Star and Sash, German Air Force Command Pilot Wings, The Most Noble Order of the Crown of Thailand-First Class—Knight Grand Cross, Honorary Royal Thai Air Force Wings, the Order of Aeronautical Merit (Brazil), and Commander of the French Légion d'honneur.

Effective dates of promotion
Source:

See also
List of commanders of USAFE

References

External links
The New York Times – obituary – Bruce K. Holloway – 9 October 1999-10-09. Accessed 31 October 2010
Speech delivered by Bruce K. Holloway to the Comstock Club of Sacramento, California on May 22, 1967

|-

United States Army personnel of World War II
American World War II flying aces
Aviators from Tennessee
United States Air Force generals
Recipients of the Distinguished Flying Cross (United States)
Recipients of the Silver Star
Recipients of the Distinguished Service Medal (US Army)
United States Military Academy alumni
Marion Military Institute alumni
Recipients of the Legion of Merit
Commandeurs of the Légion d'honneur
Grand Crosses with Star and Sash of the Order of Merit of the Federal Republic of Germany
Recipients of the Air Medal
Recipients of the Order of the Sacred Tripod
People from Knoxville, Tennessee
1912 births
1999 deaths
Vice Chiefs of Staff of the United States Air Force
Military personnel from Tennessee
Recipients of the Air Force Distinguished Service Medal